Mexicanism may be:
a linguistic feature peculiar to Mexican Spanish
Mexican patriotism, especially among expatriate Mexican Americans, see Chicano Movement
a synonym for Mexicayotl, a religious and traditional movement, see Antonio Velasco Piña

See also
Mexicanisimo, a 2010 album by Yanni